Pasieki may refer to:

Pasieki, Kuyavian-Pomeranian Voivodeship (north-central Poland)
Pasieki, Lublin Voivodeship (east Poland)
Pasieki, Podlaskie Voivodeship (north-east Poland)
Pasieki, Lipsko County in Masovian Voivodeship (east-central Poland)
Pasieki, Ostrołęka County in Masovian Voivodeship (east-central Poland)
Pasieki, Opole Voivodeship (south-west Poland)
Pasieki, Warmian-Masurian Voivodeship (north Poland)